In number theory, Grimm's conjecture (named after Carl Albert Grimm, 1 April 1926 – 2 January 2018) states that to each element of a set of consecutive composite numbers one can assign a distinct prime that divides it. It was first published in American Mathematical Monthly, 76(1969) 1126-1128.

Formal statement

If n + 1, n + 2, …, n + k are all composite numbers, then there are k distinct primes pi such that pi divides n + i for 1 ≤ i ≤ k.

Weaker version

A weaker, though still unproven, version of this conjecture states: If there is no prime in the interval , then  has at least k distinct prime divisors.

See also
Prime gap

References

Guy, R. K. "Grimm's Conjecture." §B32 in Unsolved Problems in Number Theory, 3rd ed., Springer Science+Business Media, pp. 133–134, 2004.

External links
 Prime Puzzles #430

Conjectures about prime numbers
Unsolved problems in number theory